Acutia is a monotypic moth genus of the family Pyralidae. Its one species is Acutia falciferalis, found in Brazil.

References

Chrysauginae
Monotypic moth genera
Moths of South America
Pyralidae genera
Taxa named by Émile Louis Ragonot